Praveena is an Indian Television actress and a dubbing artist who predominantly appears in Malayalam films, she has also appeared in Tamil and Telugu films.

She started her acting career through 1992 film Gowri. She has received several accolades including Kerala State Film Award for Second Best Actress for her performances in the films Agnisakshi in 1998 and Oru Pennum Randaanum  in 2008. She received the Kerala State Film Award for Best Dubbing Artist for the films Elektra in 2010 and Ivan Megharoopan in 2012.

Career
She appeared in multiple films, including Agnisakshi, English Medium, Vasanthiyum Lakshmiyum Pinne Njaanum, Swarnam and Oru Pennum Randaanum. Kasthooriman later debuted in Malayalam cinema through Anil Babu's Kaliyoonjal in which she was paired opposite Dileep. In Oral Mathram The Truth and Ezhupunna Tharakan,

She has won Kerala State Film Award four times.  In 1998, she won the Kerala State Film Award for Second Best Actress for her performance in Agnisakshi and in 2008 she won the same award for her role in Oru Pennum Randaanum. In 2010 and 2011, she won the Kerala State Film Award for Best Dubbing Artist for Elektra and Ivan Megharoopan respectively.

Her serials include Swapnam, Megham the recent Mounam, Malakhamar in Mazhavil Manorama and Mohakkadal.  She has also has been judge on several reality shows including Mummy & Me on Kairali TV, Comedy Stars and Star Singer on Asianet.

Kasthooriman has performed as a voice artist, for actresses like Jyothirmayi in Ente Veedu Appuvinteyum for Kavya Madhavan in Mizhi Randilum and Sadanandante Samayam and for Padmapriya in Amrutham.

Personal life
Praveena was born to Ramachandran Nair and Lalithabai. Her father is a retired college professor. She has an elder brother, Pramod Nair, who works as a software engineer in the United States. She is married to Mr. Pramod Kumar who is a business person in Kerala. Following her marriage, she took a short hiatus from acting. The couple have a daughter.

Awards

Kerala State Film Award
1998: Second Best Actress - Agnisakshi
2008: Second Best Actress - Oru Pennum Randaanum
2010: Best Dubbing Artist - Elektra
2011: Best Dubbing Artist - Ivan Megharoopan
Asianet Television Awards
2005- Best Actress - Megham
2011- Most Popular Actress - Devimahathmyam
2018- Best Character Actress- Kasthooriman

Kerala Film Critics Association Awards
1999 - Best Actress - Vasanthiyum Lakshmiyum Pinne Njaanum 
 2007 -  Best Dubbing Artist - Novel

Sun Kudumbam Viruthugal
2018 -Sun Kudumbam Viruthugal for Best Mother -Priyamanaval

Filmography

As actor
All films are in Malayalam language unless and otherwise noted

As a dubbing artist (partial)

Jungle Book Shōnen Mowgli – Mowgli
Unda (2019) - Easwari Rao
Sakhavinte Priyasakhi (2018) - Neha Saxena
Edavappathy  (2016) – Manisha Koirala
Njan Samvidhanam Cheyyum (2015) - Sreedhanya
Homely Meals (2014)-Srinda
Ivan Megharoopan (2012) - Padmapriya
Elektra (2010) – Manisha Koirala
Makaramanju (2012) - Mallika Kapoor
Oru Small Family (2010) – Seetha
Madambi (2008) - Mallika Kapoor
Novel (2008) – Sada
Naalu Pennungal (2007) – Padmapriya
Photographer (2006) – Saranya
Vaasthavam (2006) – Kavya Madhavan
Karutha Pakshikal (2006) - Meena
Amrutham (2006)  - Padmapriya
Symphony  (2004) -Anu I.V
Ente Veedu Appuvinteyum (2003) – Jyothirmayi
Sadanandante Samayam (2003) – Kavya Madhavan
Mizhi Randilum (2003) - Kavya Madhavan
Sthithi (2003) - Nandini Ghosal
Shobhanam (1997) - Meenakumari (Character - Reshma)
Superman (1997) - Sreejaya Nair
Innalekalillaathe (1997) - (Character - Cicily)
Itha Oru Snehagatha (1997) - (Character - Rani)
 Kilukil Pambaram (1997) – Kaveri
Moharavam (Doordarshan) - Manju Warrier - {TV Serial}

Television

 Web series

Telefilms as an actress

2006 : Neermaathalathinte Pookkal (Amrita TV) as lead role
2007 : Annayude Lillipookkal (Surya TV) as Alice
2013 : Baby Sitter

Television programmes as an anchor
Sapthaswarangal (Music Show, Doordarshan)
Sangeethika (Music Show, Doordarshan)
Maharani (Star Vijay)
Snehasparsham (Asianet News)

Albums
 Sree Ramanam Devadevan
 Tamil
 Paaduka Saigal Paadu
 Iniyennum - Singer
 Amma - Singer

Reality shows as a judge
Raree Rareram Raro (Asianet Plus)
Mummy & Me (Kairali TV)
Idea Star Singer (Asianet)
Vodafone Comedy Stars (Asianet)
Yuvatharam (Jaihind TV)
Grihalakshmi (Jaihind TV)
Super Dancer Junior (Amrita TV)

References

External links
Official website

Kasthooriman at MSI

Living people
Actresses from Kerala
Actresses in Malayalam cinema
20th-century Indian actresses
People from Changanassery
Kerala State Film Award winners
21st-century Indian actresses
Actresses in Malayalam television
Indian television actresses
Indian voice actresses
Indian film actresses
Year of birth missing (living people)
Actresses in Tamil cinema
Actresses in Tamil television
Actresses in Telugu cinema
Actresses in Telugu television